Elections to Sheffield City Council were held on 7 May 1987. One third of the council was up for election.

Election result

This result had the following consequences for the total number of seats on the Council after the elections:

Ward results

Howard Knight was a sitting councillor for Sharrow ward

Frank White was a sitting councillor for Birley ward

Jeremy Richardson was a sitting councillor for Ecclesall ward

David Brown was a sitting councillor for Darnall ward, and was previously elected as a Labour councillor

References

1987 English local elections
1987
1980s in Sheffield